Uriage-les-Bains (or Uriage) is a spa town in France, at  above sea level. Uriage is attached to the communes of Saint-Martin-d'Uriage and Vaulnaveys-le-Haut and is located in the department of Isère, beneath the ski resort of Chamrousse. The inhabitants are called the Uriageois (es). Uriage does not have the status of a municipality.

Uriage is served by the departmental road 524, which is the old N524 from Grenoble to Vizille, through Gières.

Origin
The town was established during the Roman Empire. The Romans built baths to enjoy the anti-rheumatic properties of the springwater. They ventured up to the Croix de Chamrousse at the foot of which, eight Roman bronze medals were found, in 1856.

Uriage thermal water
Uriage thermal water contains sulphide and salt, and has a molecular concentration similar to that of human blood serum, which is unique in the world and allowed to be administered directly in intra-muscular injections.

There are various curing techniques including showers, baths, hydromassages, applications of mud, filiform shower and aerosols.

See also
List of spa towns in France

External links

 Official website

Spa towns in France
Geography of Isère